Godfrey Downes Carter (1830 – 29 April 1902) was an Australian businessman, politician and mayor of Melbourne from 1884 to 1885.

Born in Jamaica the son of a slaveholder, Carter was educated in England, and migrated to Australia in 1853.  He would ultimately benefit from the compensation his father received from the British government for 22 slaves upon the abolition of slavery. Following his term as mayor, Carter represented the Electoral district of West Melbourne in the Victorian Legislative Assembly from 1885 to 1889. Carter died in South Yarra, Victoria on 29 April 1902.

References

1830 births
1902 deaths
English emigrants to colonial Australia
Mayors and Lord Mayors of Melbourne
Members of the Victorian Legislative Assembly
Treasurers of Victoria 
Emigrants from British Jamaica
19th-century Australian politicians